Stanislav Pavlovschi (born 24 January 1955) is a lawyer and politician from the Republic of Moldova, one of the founders of the Dignity and Truth Platform Party, an active participant in the social and political life of the Republic Moldova, advocating for protection of human rights and  Moldova's adherence to the rule of law in Moldova.

Education 
From 1962 to 1972 he studied at the Florești school. In 1976 he was enrolled at the Law Institute in Kharkiv, Ukraine, currently the National Law University of Ukraine, which he graduated in 1980 and was awarded the merit distinction.

Professional activity 
Between 1980 and 1985, he was employed as an investigator and senior investigator at the Criuleni district prosecutor's office. From 1985 to 2001, he worked as an investigator on exceptional cases, senior investigator on exceptional cases, deputy head of the investigation department for exceptional cases and later deputy chief of the Criminal Prosecutor's Office of the Prosecutor General's Office.

From 1996 to 2001, he was a member of the Multidisciplinary Anti-corruption Group, established by the Council of Europe, where he participated in the elaboration of the Civil and Criminal Conventions  against corruption.

In 2001 - 2008 he served as a Judge at the European Court of Human Rights.

Since 2008 he is a lawyer at the Union of Lawyers of Moldova. He works in the Associate Law  Bureau "Corect", Chisinau, Republic of Moldova. He has participated in several EU projects on reforming the justice sector in Macedonia, Georgia, Azerbaijan, etc.

On 8 June 2019 he was appointed the Minister of Justice  within Sandu Cabinet,  he resigned from the position on 23 June 2019. Stanislav Pavlovschi mentioned that "When I was working on the Action Plan in the field of Justice, I identified several personal incompatibilities, which, unfortunately, according to the Constitution of the Republic of Moldova make my activity impossible as a Member of the Government... I remain committed  to the democratic and pro-European values, promoted by the Dignity and Truth Platform and I will continue to promote them in the position of the deputy chairman of the Political Party  Dignity and Truth Platform”.

On 16 September 2019 Stanislav Pavlovschi resigned from the position of the deputy chairman  of the "Dignity and Truth Platform Political Party,  and announce his retirement form the politics.

Awards 
He hold the honorary title "Om Emerit".

References 

1955 births
Moldovan jurists
Moldovan Ministers of Justice
Living people
People from Florești District